The Centrium is a skyscraper located in the Central district of Hong Kong. The building was completed in 2001. It was designed by architectural firm DP Architects, and was developed by the Sino Group Limited. The Centrium, which stands as the 75th-tallest building in Hong Kong, is composed almost entirely of commercial office space; the lowermost floors are used for retailing. A spire was added to the building in 2002, one year after its initial completion; the spire lights up in various colors at night.

See also
List of tallest buildings in Hong Kong
The Center

References

External links

 

Skyscraper office buildings in Hong Kong
Commercial buildings completed in 2001
Retail buildings in Hong Kong